is a female professional 6 dan Go player.

Biography
Born Yumiko Abe (安倍 結美子), Okada is the daughter of Yoshiteru Abe, who also acted as her tutor. She is married to Shinichiro Okada, a 7 dan professional. In 2004, Yumiko Okada obtained the rank of 6 dan.

Notes

Japanese Go players
Female Go players
1970 births
Living people